Alexei Sergeevich Smirnov (born January 28, 1982) is a Russian former professional ice hockey player. He mainly played in the Russian Superleague and Kontinental Hockey League, and also played 52 games in the National Hockey League between 2002 and 2004 with the Mighty Ducks of Anaheim, who selected him 12th overall in the 2000 NHL Entry Draft. Internationally Smirnov played for the Russian national under-18 team at the 1999 and 2000 Under-18 World Championships, winning a silver medal in 2000. He retired in 2015.

Playing career
Smirnov was drafted 12th overall in the 2000 NHL Entry Draft by the Mighty Ducks of Anaheim. He played 52 games for the Mighty Ducks over two seasons between 2002 and 2004 before returning to Russia, playing around there until retiring in 2015.

Personal
Has a son named Patrick.

Smirnov and his family live in Malibu and St. Louis during the off-season.

Career statistics

Regular season and playoffs

International

External links

1982 births
Anaheim Ducks draft picks
Avangard Omsk players
Buran Voronezh players
Cincinnati Mighty Ducks players
HC Almaty players
HC CSKA Moscow players
HC Dynamo Moscow players
HC Khimik Voskresensk players
HC Shakhtyor Soligorsk players
HC Vityaz players
Krylya Sovetov Moscow players
Living people
Long Beach Ice Dogs (ECHL) players
Mighty Ducks of Anaheim players
National Hockey League first-round draft picks
Rubin Tyumen players
Russian ice hockey centres
Sportspeople from Tver
THK Tver players
Toros Neftekamsk players